Tau Films is an American visual effects and animation company with locations in the United States, Malaysia, India, China, and Canada.

History
Tau Films was founded in 2014 by John Hughes, Mandeep Singh, and Walt Jones. In 2015, it was nominated for Outstanding Visual Effects in a Special Venue Project at the 13th Visual Effects Society Awards for its work on the amusement park special venue-ride film The Lost Temple (Movie Park Germany). It has since produced other special venue-ride films such as The Forbidden Caves (Bobbejaanland) and Racing Legends at Ferrari Land (PortAventura World:Ferrari Land). It also created Delusion: Lies Within (virtual reality episodic storytelling). Tau has worked on films such as Evil Nature (2018), Baahubali: The Beginning (2015), 2.0 (2018), Crazy Alien (2019), the 2019 Nicolas Cage film Primal, Simon West's Skyfire (2019), and Li Weiran's The Yinyang Master (2021).

Filmography
2021
The Battle at Lake Changjin (release date September 30, 2021)
The Yinyang Master 

2019
Skyfire
Primal
 Crazy Alien

2018
 2.0
 Delusion: Lies Within
Evil Nature

2017
 WildAid: Jackie Chan & Pangolins (Kung Fu Pangolin) 
 Racing Legends at Ferrari Land (PortAventura World:Ferrari Land)

2015
 Baahubali: The Beginning
Everest
Hogwarts Express - London (Warner Bros. Studio Tour London- Platform 9¾)
  The Forbidden Caves (Bobbejaanland)

2014
 The Lost Temple (Movie Park Germany)

Awards and nominations
2015: Nominated - Outstanding Visual Effects in a Special Venue Project, 13th Visual Effects Society Awards. The Lost Temple (Movie Park Germany)

References

External links
 

Computer animation
Visual effects companies
American animation studios
Entertainment companies based in California